Marco Robert Bjurström (born 31 May 1966 in Helsinki, Finland) is a Finnish dance instructor, director, choreographer, television host, and news anchor. He is best known as the host of the television game show BumtsiBum! (1997–2005), which was ultimately based on the Irish The Lyrics Board and watched weekly by more than a million people. Bjurström has hosted several ceremonies, such as the election gathering of President of Finland Tarja Halonen.

Bjurström has also directed the Finnish versions of three musical stage productions for the Peacock Theatre at Linnanmäki – Grease (2002), Hair (2003), and Saturday Night Fever (2004). Bjurström also hosted the Finnish version of Dancing with the Stars from 2006 to 2009 with Ella Kanninen (2006–2007), Vanessa Kurri (2008) and Vappu Pimiä (2009). In February 2010 it was announced that Bjurström will be replaced by actor Mikko Leppilampi as Bjurström will be the head judge of Dance Suomi, the Finnish version of So You Think You Can Dance. Bjurström was also seen during the pauses of the live Idols broadcasts.

He has been awarded the best male TV performer Telvis four times: in 1997, 1998, 1999, and 2000. His game show BumtsiBum! was also awarded three Venlas in 1997–1998.

References

External links 
Homepage
 

1966 births
Artists from Helsinki
Musical theatre directors
Finnish choreographers
Living people
Finnish LGBT entertainers